Gary Grimes (born June 2, 1955) is a former American actor.

Biography
Grimes was born in San Francisco, California. His uncle was actor Rudy Solari. Grimes' first major role was in the 1971 film Summer of '42, playing a teenager, based on author Herman Raucher, who has an affair with a beautiful older woman (Jennifer O'Neill). For the role, Grimes was nominated for a 1972 Golden Globe Award as Most Promising Newcomer, as well as the BAFTA Award as Most Promising Newcomer to Leading Film Roles. Grimes then starred in the sequel Class of '44 (1973), which followed his character to college.

Grimes' other film credits include Cahill U.S. Marshal (1973) alongside John Wayne, The Spikes Gang (1974) with Lee Marvin, Ron Howard and Charles Martin Smith, and the cult Disney film Gus (1976), about a mule that kicks field goals. He was offered a TV series during that time period, but turned it down.

Grimes appeared in only six films, and largely retired from show business in the late 1970s (except for an episode of Matt Houston in 1983). He still lives in Los Angeles and has remained out of public view since that time, working for a charitable organization. "I got to the point where the work wasn't up to the quality that I wanted," Grimes told American Profile magazine in 2011. "I'm very happy in my decision."

Filmography

Award nominations

References

External links
 
 

Living people
1955 births
American male film actors
Male actors from San Francisco